Marguerite Merington (1857/60/61 – May 20, 1951) was an English-born American author of short stories, essays, dramatic works, and biographies. For several years, she taught in Greek and Latin at the Normal College in New York before pursuing a career as an author.

Early life and education
Marguerite Merington was born in Stoke Newington, England, in 1857, 1860, or ca. 1861.

At an early age, she came with her parents to Buffalo, New York where was educated at a convent. Even as a girl, she displayed dramatic talent, and often wrote and acted little parlor plays.

Career
For several years, she was instructor in Greek and Latin in the Normal College in New York. After resigning from this position, Merington pursued the career of a dramatic author. About 1889, E. H. Sothern proposed that Merington should write him a play, the leading character of which should be a captivating Irish gentleman. With a few suggestions from him, the play, Captain Lettarblair was written. Before it was performed, Joseph Jefferson, saw the manuscript and praised it highly. The play had a trial run at an authors' matinee in New York City, and was first presented August 16, 1892, at the Lyceum Theatre. Captain Lettarblair, produced by Daniel Frohman, brought in large audiences, was financially successful, and held a place in Sothern's repertoire.

Merington wrote other dramas, including Good-Bye, A Lover's Knot, and the libretto of a comic opera, Daphne, or the Pipes of Arcadia. After having served as the private secretary of Elizabeth Bacon Custer, Merington became the editor of The Custer Story: The LIfe and Intimate Letters of General George A. Custer and His Wife Elizabeth.

Death
Merington died on May 20, 1951, in her Manhattan home. Of her life she said: "There is absolutely nothing about me to be told, and that I never tell."

Selected works

 At parting; comedy ...
 The Children's Garden : given in the name of Frances Hodgson Burnett.
 Kindly light; a modern morality play ...
 One life to give; drama in verse founded on the story of Nathan Hale ...
 An everyday man; comedy ...
 Love Finds the Way
 The island; a drama ...
 That little shabby gentleman; comedy ...
 The court of Ferrara; a dialogue ...
 Pepilia; comedy ...
 "Good-bye!" A story of love and sacrifice ...
 The musical isle ...
 The key to the house; play ...
 Drum and fife parade ...
 "Captain Lettarblair"; a drama in three acts
 Old orchard ... called Rose Valley in Chicago Production.
 Daphne, or, The pipes of Arcadia : three acts of singing nonesense , 1896
 The right ending : one-act sketch in blank verse for three persons, two men and one woman--, 19??
 Late Dyal & Co.; a farce-comedy in three acts., 19??
 Cranford; a play; a comedy in three acts made from Mrs. Gaskell's famous story., 1905
 The turn of the tide : a play in four acts, 1905
 The lady in the adjoining room : one-act play, 1905
 Snow-white : a play for children , 1905
 The Gibson play a two-act comedy based on Mr. Charles Dana Gibson's series of cartoons "A widow and her friends" originally printed in "Life,", 1901
 Scarlett of the Mounted ... Illustrated., 1906
 Picture plays, 1911
 More fairy tale plays, 1917
 Fairy tale plays, 1925
 Story of the Custer massacre, now fifty years past, is retold by widow of famous Indian fighter , 1926
 A Dish o' Tea Delayed. One-act play for high school girls, etc., 1937
 Edwin Booth; sketch for a cinema; sequence of scenes and dialogue,, 194?
 Booth episodes; play in eight episodes, nine scenes, founded on the life of Edwin Booth. , 1944
 The Custer story : the life and intimate letters of General George A. Custer and his wife Elizabeth, 1950

Notes

References

Attribution

Bibliography

External links
 

1857 births
1951 deaths
People from Stoke Newington
19th-century English writers
19th-century British women writers
19th-century American women writers
19th-century English educators
19th-century American educators
20th-century English writers
20th-century British women writers
20th-century American women writers
20th-century American non-fiction writers
19th-century American women educators
19th-century American dramatists and playwrights
20th-century American dramatists and playwrights
British dramatists and playwrights
British biographers
American biographers
Hunter College faculty
American women biographers